Pa O'Sullivan was a Gaelic footballer from Killorglin, County Kerry. He played with Kerry at all levels during the 1990s. He was described as a 'star' and a 'teen sensation' for Kerry during the 90's.

Club

He enjoyed much success at club level with Laune Rangers. In 1995 he won county Minor, Under and Senior titles with the club. He later won a Munster Senior Club Football Championship in 1995. He was later part of the panel as the club won the 1996 All-Ireland Senior Club Football Championship. Later in 1996 he won a second county and Munster titles.

Schools

In 1996 he won a Corn Uí Mhuirí and Hogan Cup with the Intermediate School, Killorglin as the team's captain.

Third level

He was one of the stats with Tralee IT teams that won Sigerson Cups in 1998 and 1999.

Hurling

He also played hurling with Kerry and Under 14 and 16 levels.

Minor

He joined the Kerry minor team during the 1994 championship. Win's over Limerick, Cork and Clare seen O'Sullivan win a Munster title. He missed out on the All-Ireland semi-final win over Armagh. He returned for the All-Ireland final againest Galway. He scored a point as Kerry took the title.

He was underage again in 1995, but Kerry lost out to Cork in the Munster first round after a replay.

Under 21

He then moved on to the counties Under 21 team. His first game was when he came on as a sub in the 1996 All-Ireland semi-final win over Galway O'Sullivan Pa - HoganStand</ref>

He was a requler in the team during the 1997 season. Win over Limerick where he scored 3 points, Clare where he scored 1-04 and Cork after a replay where he scored 1-04 and 4 points seen him win a Munster Under-21 Football Championship. Despite 6 points from O'Sullivan Kerry lost out to Meath in the All-Ireland semi-final.

References

External links
 Terrace Talk :: Kerry Football :: League Appearances :: Pa O'Sullivan
 Under 21 Football « Munster GAA Web site
 HoganStand - GAA Football & Hurling

Year of birth missing (living people)
Living people
Laune Rangers Gaelic footballers
Kerry inter-county Gaelic footballers
Alumni of Institute of Technology, Tralee